Battery "A" 4th Regiment of Artillery was a light artillery battery that served in the Union Army during the American Civil War.

Service
The battery was consolidated with Battery C, 4th U.S. Light Artillery from October 1861 until October 18, 1862. Sumner's Division, Army of the Potomac, to March 1862. Artillery, 1st Division, II Corps, Army of the Potomac, to November 1862. Reserve Artillery, II Corps, to May 1863. Artillery Brigade, II Corps, to July 1863. 1st Brigade, Horse Artillery, Army of the Potomac, to June 1864. 1st Brigade, Hardin's Division, XXII Corps, to July 1864. Camp Barry, Defenses of Washington, D.C., XXII Corps, to August 1865.

Detailed service
Duty in the defenses of Washington, D.C., until March 1862. Moved to the Virginia Peninsula. Siege of Yorktown April 5-May 4. Battle of Seven Pines, Fair Oaks, May 31-June 1. Seven Days Battles before Richmond June 25-July 1. Peach Orchard and Savage Station June 29. White Oak Swamp and Glendale June 30. Malvern Hill July 1. At Harrison's Landing until August 16. Moved to Alexandria and Centreville August 16–28. Covered Pope's retreat August 28-September 2. Maryland Campaign September 6–22. Battle of Antietam September 16–17. At Harpers Ferry September 22-October 30. Received 70 men who transferred from the 4th Ohio Infantry and refitted at Washington, D.C. before rejoining II Corps. Movement to Falmouth, Va., October 30-November 19. Battle of Fredericksburg December 12–15. At Falmouth, Va., until April 1863. Chancellorsville Campaign April 27-May 6. Battle of Chancellorsville May 1–5. Gettysburg Campaign June 11-July 16. Battle of Gettysburg July 1–3. Made a horse battery July 15, and attached to 1st Division, Cavalry Corps, Army of the Potomac. Advanced to the Rapidan September 13–17. Culpeper Court House September 13. Reconnaissance across the Rapidan September 21–23. Bristoe Campaign October 9–22. White Sulphur Springs October 12. Bristoe Station October 14. St. Stephen's Church October 14. Advance to line of the Rappahannock November 7–8. Mine Run Campaign November 26-December 2. Parker's Store November 29. Rapidan Campaign May 4-June 4, 1864. Battle of the Wilderness May 5–7. Sheridan's Raid to the James River May 9–24. North Anna River May 9. Ground Squirrel Church and Yellow Tavern May 11. Brook Church, Fortifications of Richmond, May 12. On line of the Pamunkey May 26–28. Totopotomoy May 28–31. Cold Harbor May 31-June 1. Dismounted and sent to Washington, D.C., June 4. Duty in the defenses of Washington, D.C., until August 1865.

Commanders
 Captain George Washington Hazzard - mortally wounded at the Battle of White Oak Swamp
 Brevet Captain Rufus King, Jr. - commanded at the Battle of White Oak Swamp while still at the rank of 1st lieutenant after Cpt Hazzard was mortally wounded
 Lieutenant Alonzo H. Cushing- commanded at the Battle of Gettysburg; killed in action
 1st Lieutenant Evan Thomas
 1st Lieutenant Horatio B. Reed
 2nd Lieutenant Samuel Canby - commanded at the Battle of Gettysburg after Lt Cushing was wounded and until he was wounded in action
 2nd Lieutenant Joseph S. Milne - commanded at the Battle of Gettysburg after Lt Canby was wounded and until he was wounded in action
 1st Sergeant Frederick Füger - commanded at the Battle of Gettysburg after all officers were killed or wounded in action

Notable members
 Lieutenant Alonozo H. Cushing - Medal of Honor recipient for action at the Battle of Gettysburg
 1st Sergeant Frederick Füger - Medal of Honor recipient for action at the Battle of Gettysburg
 Captain Rufus King, Jr. - Medal of Honor recipient for action at the Battle of White Oak Swamp

See also

 List of United States Regular Army Civil War units
 4th Air Defense Artillery Regiment

References
 Brown, Kent M. Cushing of Gettysburg: The Story of a Union Artillery Commander (Lexington, KY: University Press of Kentucky), 1993. 
 Dyer, Frederick H. A Compendium of the War of the Rebellion (Des Moines, IA: Dyer Pub. Co.), 1908.
Attribution

External links
 Battery A, 4th U.S. Light Artillery monument at Gettysburg Battlefield
 Monument to Lt Alonzo Cushing at Gettysburg Battlefield

United States Regular Army Civil War units and formations
U
Military units and formations established in 1861
Military units and formations disestablished in 1865